The 2019–20 season is Alloa Athletic's 2nd consecutive season in the Scottish Championship. Alloa also competed in the Challenge Cup, League Cup and the Scottish Cup.

Competitions

Scottish Championship

League table

Results

Scottish Cup

Challenge Cup

League Cup

Player details 

As of 3 August 2019

Transfers

Transfers in

Transfers out

Loans in

See also 

 2019–20 in Scottish football

References 

Alloa Athletic F.C. seasons
Alloa